The 1940 Argentine Primera División was the 49th season of top-flight football in Argentina. The season began on April 7 and ended on December 22.

With 18 teams competing in the tournament, Boca Juniors achieved its 10th league title. Banfield returned to Primera while Vélez Sársfield and Chacarita Juniors were relegated.

League standings

References

Argentine Primera Division
Primera Division
Argentine Primera División seasons